Papunya (Pintupi-Luritja: Warumpi) is a small Indigenous Australian community roughly  northwest of Alice Springs (Mparntwe) in the Northern Territory, Australia. It is known as an important centre for Contemporary Indigenous Australian art, in particular the style created by the Papunya Tula artists in the 1970s, referred to colloquially as dot painting. Its population in 2016 was 404.

History
Pintupi and Luritja people were forced off their traditional country in the 1930s and moved into Hermannsburg (Ntaria) and Haasts Bluff, where there were government ration depots. There were often tragic confrontations between these people, with their nomadic hunter-gathering lifestyle, and the cattlemen who were moving into the country and over-using the limited water supplies of the region for their cattle.

The Australian Government built a water bore and some basic housing at Papunya in the 1950s to provide room for the increasing populations of people in the already-established Aboriginal communities and reserves.  The community grew to over a thousand people in the early 1970s and was plagued by poor living conditions, health problems, and tensions between various tribal and linguistic groups. These festering problems led many people, especially the Pintupi, to move further west closer to their traditional country. After settling in a series of outstations, with little or no support from the government, the new community of Kintore was established about west of Papunya in the early 1980s.

The term "Finke River Mission" was initially an alternative name for the mission at Hermannsburg, but this name was later often used to include the settlements at Haasts Bluff, Areyonga and, later, Papunya. It now refers to all Lutheran missionary activity in Central Australia since the first mission was established at Hermannsburg in 1877.

Description and demographics

It is now home to a number of displaced Aboriginal people, mainly from the Pintupi and Luritja groups. At the 2016 Australian census, Papunya had a population of 404.

The predominant religion at Papunya is  Lutheranism, with 310 members, or 78.7% of the population, based on the 2016 census.

It is the closest town to the Australian continental pole of inaccessibility. Papunya is on restricted Aboriginal land and requires a permit to enter or travel through.

Warumpi Band were an Australian country and Aboriginal rock group which formed in Papunya.

Art

Papunya Tula

During the 1970s a striking new art style emerged in Papunya, which by the 1980s began to attract national and then international attention as a significant Indigenous art movement, colloquially known as dot painting. Leading exponents of the style, who belonged to the Papunya Tula art cooperative founded in Papunya in 1972, included Clifford Possum Tjapaltjarri, Billy Stockman Tjapaltjarri, Kaapa Tjampitjinpa, Turkey Tolson Tjupurrula, and Pansy Napangardi.

Papunya Tjupi Arts

Papunya Tjupi Arts, a community-based, 100% Aboriginal-owned arts organisation, commenced in 2007, and  hosts around 150 artists, many of whose works are featured in exhibitions and galleries around the world. In 2009, Michael Nelson Tjakamarra (Kumantje Jagamara) became the artist leader at the arts centre.

Artists include Doris Bush Nungarrayi, Maureen Poulson, Charlotte Phillipus Napurrula, Tilau Nangala, Mona Nangala, Nellie Nangala, Carbiene McDonald Tjangala, Martha McDonald Napaltjarri, Candy Nelson Nakamarra, Dennis Nelson Tjakamarra, Narlie Nelson Nakamarra, Isobel Major Nampatjimpa, Isobel Gorey, Mary Roberts, Beyula Putungka Napanangka, Watson Corby among others.

See also
 Contemporary Indigenous Australian art
 Geoffrey Bardon
 Honey ant dreaming

Notes

Further reading
 Desart: Aboriginal art and craft centres of Central Australia. (1993) Co-ordinator Diana James DESART, Alice Springs. 
 Papunya Tula: Art of the Western Desert. (1992) Geoffrey Bardon. Tuttle Publishers. 
 Papunya Tula: Genesis and Genius. (2001) Eds. Hetti Perkins and Hannah Fink. Art Gallery of NSW in association with Papunya Tula Artists. .

External links
 Papunya Painting: Out of the Desert An online exhibition of Papunya artworks held by the National Museum of Australia. The website includes the works, biographies of the artists, installation images and a bibliography.

Towns in the Northern Territory
Aboriginal communities in the Northern Territory
MacDonnell Region